Baldwin IV (980 – 30 May 1035), called the Bearded, was the count of Flanders from 987 until his death.

Baldwin IV was the son of Count Arnulf II of Flanders (c. 961 — 987) and Rozala of Italy (950/60 – 1003), of the House of Ivrea. He succeeded his father as Count of Flanders in 987, but with his mother Rozala as the regent until his majority.

In contrast to his predecessors Baldwin turned his attention eastward, leaving the southern part of his territory in the hands of his vassals the counts of Guînes, Hesdin, and St. Pol. To the north of the county Baldwin was given Zeeland as a fief by the Holy Roman Emperor Henry II, while on the right bank of the Scheldt river he received Valenciennes (1013) and parts of the Cambresis as well as Saint-Omer and the northern Ternois (1020). In his French territories, the supremacy of the Baldwin remained unchallenged. A great deal of colonization of marshland was organized along the coastline of Flanders and the harbour and city of Brugge were enlarged.

Baldwin first married Ogive, daughter of Frederick of Luxembourg, by whom he had a son and heir, Baldwin V (1012 – 1067). He later married Eleanor, daughter of Richard II of Normandy, by whom he had a daughter, Judith (1033 – 1094). Baldwin IV died on 30 May 1035.

See also

Counts of Flanders family tree

Notes

References

Flanders, Baldwin IV of
Flanders, Baldwin IV of
House of Flanders
Baldwin 4
Margraves of Valenciennes
Medieval child monarchs